Matsesta railway station is a railway station in the Matsesta Microdistrict, Khostinsky City District, Sochi, Russia. The station was opened in 1929.

In Soviet times, the station had also been used hitherto preserved Matsestinskaya branch from the station to the Old Matsesta Matsesty built as the main highway in 1925. It was built for passenger and freight traffic, was subsequently used only for freight traffic for delivery to the bathrooms resort building Matsesta oil and removal from mineral sources of hydrogen sulfide water resort for its delivery in Clinics Greater Sochi.

References

Railway stations in Sochi
Railway stations in Russia opened in 1929